Yevhen Volkov (born 25 May 1948) is a Soviet middle-distance runner. He competed in the men's 800 metres at the 1972 Summer Olympics.

References

1948 births
Living people
Athletes (track and field) at the 1972 Summer Olympics
Soviet male middle-distance runners
Olympic athletes of the Soviet Union
Place of birth missing (living people)